Wedderburn's theorem may refer to:

 Artin–Wedderburn theorem, classifying semisimple rings and semisimple algebras
 Wedderburn's theorem on simple rings with a unit and a minimal left ideal
 Wedderburn's little theorem, that a finite domain is a commutative field